Polygala amara is a species of flowering plant in the milkwort family (Polygalaceae). It was described in 1769 and is found in Germany, Poland, Slovakia, the Czech Republic, Hungary, Slovenia, Croatia, Bosnia, Serbia, and Montenegro.

References 

amara
Flora of Germany
Flora of Poland
Flora of Slovenia
Flora of the Czech Republic
Flora of Hungary
Flora of Croatia
Flora of Bosnia and Herzegovina
Flora of Serbia
Flora of Montenegro